Let's Play is a romantic comedy webcomic published on Webtoon since 2016 by Leeanne M. Krecic, also known as Mongie. It follows the romantic and professional life of Sam Young, who is discovering romance as she works on her video game development career. Let's Play is published in print by Rocketship Entertainment.

Let's Play has over 4.8 million subscribers on Webtoon and was nominated for an Eisner Award in 2019. In May 2021 it was announced that the comic would be adapted into a live-action television series by Allnighter. In November 2022 Krecic announced that the comic would be moving away from Webtoon, citing ongoing difficulties with the platform, and that the series will continue with season 4 elsewhere.

Premise 
Let's Play is a romantic comedy. It follows Sam Young, a 22 year old female software developer looking to get into video games, a passion she developed while sick in hospital. Sam's passion project, Ruminate, gets heavily criticized by a game reviewer going by “Marshall Law”, and his many fans review-bomb it. After this, Marshall Law becomes Sam's new next-door neighbor.

Sam's father is the CEO of software company Young Technologies; he is overprotective of Sam and wants her to take over the company some day, but Sam would rather make video games. At the same time, Sam, who has never had a romantic relationship, starts to feel attraction. She considers dating an old friend, Link, though the two remain friends instead. She has romantic tension with Marshall Law, and becomes flirty with her manager at Young Technologies, Charles, who is teaching her to be more confident and business savvy. Charles also falls for Sam, despite her being his boss's daughter. Season 2 of the comic ended with Sam drunkenly trying to seduce Charles at his apartment.

Let's Play explores and satirizes gaming culture and the male-dominated gaming industry. Storylines cover depression, anxiety, and family.

Publication 
Let’s Play is created by Leeanne M. Krecic, who writes and illustrates the comic under the pen name Mongie. Krecic has said that she created the comic "because I was looking for characters like me – die-hard gamers, heartfelt romantics, and young women with dreams of success on their own terms – but couldn't find them represented anywhere in the pop culture of the moment."

The comic debuted on Webtoon in 2016 and updates weekly. It finished season two in August 2020 and started season three in July 2021. Krecic said in a tweet that the start of season three was delayed by contractual negotiations.

Let's Play volume 1 was kickstarted for publication in 2019 by Rocketship Entertainment and volume 2 was kickstarted in 2020.

In November 2022, Krecic announced that season 4 of Let's Play would not be published through Webtoon. Krecic cited age gates, a lack of marketing, and racial pay disparities among the reasons. Krecic said that they would, "when the time is right" announce when and how season 4 would be published.

Reception

Readership figures 
Forbes described Let's Play as "megapopular"; according to Webtoon it had 3.6 million subscribers as of May 2021, and had received 145 million views by the end of 2019. The comic has had two Kickstarter campaigns through publisher Rocketship Entertainment that in total raised nearly $USD1 million. It has been one of the most popular series published by Webtoon.

Forbes said that Let's Play was in a genre not well-served by "the traditional comics industry", and that works like Let's Play are "finding [their] way directly to a new generation of readers [through internet platforms], and [readers] are feeling seen and validated by those stories."

Reviews 
A writer for Forbes said that Let's Play "takes a light but thoughtful touch on a hot-button issue, playing up the romantic comedy elements in the manner of a Friends or New Girl aimed at the generation raised on YouTube and Twitch." A writer for ComicBook.com said that Let's Play "deftly mixes Internet and gaming humor". A writer for Bleeding Cool said, "Krecic's engaging story, which is both romantic and funny, works in tandem with her anime-inspired art style to make readers all for her cast of dynamic characters."

In a review for Women Write About Comics, columnist Claire Napier called Let's Play "a responsible comic, and a compassionate one", noting the creator's personal experience in tech and on YouTube, and saying, "None of the characters exist to be hated or looked down on, and the founding premise, that joining a hate mob is being part of a harmful effect, is a necessary part of today’s discourse." However, Napier felt that the comic lacked structural tension, saying that it "introduces itself as tightly-reined enemies-to-lovers with a strong #online flavour, but quickly relaxes into a three, four, or five-pronged friendship-group/colleague soap loosely centred upon one floppy character." Napier called the art "basically frictionless – Questionable Content meets seasonal anime", adding that "every gamer in this comic either has a Men's Fitness cover body or a huge, buoyant rack on a tall thin frame". She said that the dialog was often "quite explainer-text, but this does allow for absolute clarity of theme." She concluded that it was not a comic she loved, but said it had "some clever jokes and visual gags and it is agreeably bawdy at times", and recommended it for those who like soap operas or have "ever stanned a real life let's player".

Awards 
Let's Play was nominated for an Eisner Award in 2019 for Best Webcomic.

Proposed TV adaptation 
In May 2021, studio Allnighter announced a development deal to adapt Let's Play into a live-action television series, with Krecic, Amanda Kruse, Dinesh Shamdasani, Hunter Gorinson, and Tom Akel serving as executive producers. A columnist for Forbes said that this was "another sign that the serialized GenZ-friendly comics published on mobile platforms such as Webtoon are a rising force in the media industry".

Webcomic's Inspiration 
 
Ayres Andrea, from The Comics Beat, interviewed Leeanne M. Krecic, discussing her inspirations for making the story. Leeanne revealed that the concept of Let's Play was inspired by her watching a lot of Youtubers. More specifically, a video of a let's player playing an amateur fan game. The let's player was having a difficult time and shared his frustration. Leeanne stated that if the let's player and the game creator were to meet, what would happen? This gave Leeanne the idea to create a comic based on this thought. In addition, she wanted the main character to be a female gamer to promote representation as she is a female gamer herself. When Leeanne started developing her web comic on the Discover section of Webtoon, she used Twitter and Tumblr to help advertise it. Later on, the comic would become featured on Webtoon.

Publications

References

Further reading
The Beat – Interview: How Leeanne "Mongie" Krecic Went from Head of IT to Featured Webtoon Creator
Bleeding Cool – "Let's Play": Popular Webtoon Webcomic Adapted as Anime Short
The Beat – Webcomic Let’s Play is in development as live-action series

2010s webcomics
2020s webcomics
Webtoons
2016 webcomic debuts
Romance webcomics
Video game webcomics
Comics adapted into television series